Alexandra Brewis Slade (born 1965) is a New Zealand-American anthropologist and professor who studies how health reflects the interaction of human biology and culture. as well as an advocate for a reduction in global health stigma.

Career 
Brewis Slade is a President's Professor at Arizona State University and an elected fellow of the American Association for the Advancement of Science. She founded ASU's Center for Global Health, and designed and launched (in 2008) the first and largest undergraduate global health degree in the United States. She was Director of ASU's School of Human Evolution and Social Change from 2009-2017. In 2017 the School of Human Evolution and Social Change was ranked #1 in anthropology in the US for research scale and #1 in the US (#4 in the world) for research impact. She also served as an Associate Vice President for Social Sciences as ASU moved from #15 to #4 ranking nationally in social science research expenditures. Brewis Slade has served as president of the Human Biology Association.

Education
Brewis Slade's schooling was at St Cuthbert's College, Auckland and Selwyn College, Auckland. She earned her anthropology B.A at University of Auckland in 1985, her M.A. there in 1989, and her Ph.D from the University of Arizona in 1992. Her postdoctoral training in demography was at Brown University.

Research
Her research investigates how human culture and biology interact to produce disease and suffering, and what can be done about it. Brewis Slade has conducted anthropological field research in the Pacific islands, the Americas, Africa, and the Caribbean, and published extensively on the human dimensions of obesity and water insecurity. In 2011, her research demonstrating the rapid globalization of negative views toward obesity was covered on the Front page of The New York Times. Committed to the application of social science research for public good, she writes and lectures on how to improve the impacts of international development work through anthropological methods, and on strategies for recognizing and reducing stigma in global health practice.

Selected books
Brewis, A. and A. Wutich. 2019. Lazy, Crazy, and Disgusting: Stigma and the Undoing of Global Health. Johns Hopkins University Press. Winner, Carol R Ember Book Prize; Winner, Human Biology Association Book Award; Finalist, Foundation for the Sociology of Health and Illness Book Prize.
Brewis, A. 2011. Obesity: Cultural and Biocultural Perspectives. Rutgers University Press.
Brewis, A. 1996. Lives on the Line: Women and Ecology on a Pacific Atoll. Harcourt Brace Jovanovich.

References

1965 births
Living people
Date of birth missing (living people)
Fellows of the American Association for the Advancement of Science
Arizona State University faculty
University of Auckland alumni
University of Arizona alumni
New Zealand anthropologists
New Zealand women anthropologists
American anthropologists
American women anthropologists
Cultural anthropologists
American women academics
21st-century American women